Yash Sinha (born 20 August) is an Indian television actor.

Filmography

Television

Personal life 
Sinha married his co-star Amrapali Gupta on 28 November 2012.

References 

Year of birth missing (living people)
Living people
Indian male television actors
Male actors from Bihar
People from Bihar